The Qatar Davis Cup team represents Qatar in Davis Cup tennis competition and are governed by the Qatar Tennis Federation.

Qatar currently compete in the Asia/Oceania Zone of Group IV.  They won Group III in 1994 and 1997.

History
Qatar competed in its first Davis Cup in 1992.

Last team (2021) 

 Sultan Al-Alawi (Captain-player)
 Mashari Nawaf
 Mousa Shanan Zayed
 Rashed Nawaf

See also
Davis Cup
Qatar Tennis Federation

External links

Davis Cup teams
Davis Cup
Davis Cup